Anushka Asthana (born 1980) is a British Indian journalist and television presenter, who is currently deputy political editor of ITV News.

Early life 
Asthana was born in Scunthorpe, Lincolnshire, and raised in Stalybridge, Greater Manchester. Her parents, both doctors, moved to the United Kingdom from New Delhi, India in the 1970s. Asthana attended the private school Manchester High School for Girls and read economics at St John's College, Cambridge.

Career 
Asthana joined The Observer as a general reporter in 2003 and spent several months at The Washington Post in 2006 on the Laurence Stern fellowship. Later she was a political correspondent for The Times before beginning to work for Sky News in 2013 as a political correspondent.

In succession to Patrick Wintour, Asthana was appointed in December 2015 as the joint political editor of The Guardian, in a job share arrangement with Heather Stewart which began in early 2016. 

From 23 April 2017, Asthana covered the maternity leave of Allegra Stratton as the co-presenter of Peston on Sunday. Since September 2018, Asthana has co-presented ITV's Wednesday night flagship politics discussion programme Peston. That year she decided to leave her role as the joint political editor of The Guardian to present its new daily podcast Today in Focus, later being promoted to editor-at-large, replacing Gary Younge.

Asthana left the Guardian in 2021 to join ITV News as deputy political editor to Robert Peston. She was later linked to the vacant job of BBC political editor, although she ultimately remained with ITV.

References

External links

 Anushka Asthana at The Guardian

1980 births
21st-century British journalists
Alumni of St John's College, Cambridge
British people of Indian descent
The Guardian people
ITN newsreaders and journalists
Living people
People educated at Manchester High School for Girls
People from Scunthorpe
Sky News newsreaders and journalists